White Horse is an unincorporated community and census-designated place (CDP) located within Hamilton Township, in Mercer County, New Jersey, United States. As of the 2010 United States Census, the CDP's population was 9,494.

History
The community's name derives from a local tradition that holds that George Washington rode through the area on a white horse on his journey from Virginia to New York City for his first presidential inauguration in 1789.

Geography
According to the United States Census Bureau, the CDP had a total area of 3.138 square miles (8.129 km2), including 3.074 square miles (7.963 km2) of land and 0.064 square miles (0.167 km2) of water (2.05%).

Demographics

Census 2010

Census 2000
As of the 2000 United States Census there were 9,373 people, 3,722 households, and 2,687 families living in the CDP. The population density was 1,134.5/km2 (2,941.8/mi2). There were 3,818 housing units at an average density of 462.1/km2 (1,198.3/mi2). The racial makeup of the CDP was 91.80% White, 3.82% African American, 0.06% Native American, 1.66% Asian, 1.48% from other races, and 1.17% from two or more races. Hispanic or Latino of any race were 3.97% of the population.

There were 3,722 households, out of which 27.2% had children under the age of 18 living with them, 58.5% were married couples living together, 10.5% had a female householder with no husband present, and 27.8% were non-families. 24.0% of all households were made up of individuals, and 12.2% had someone living alone who was 65 years of age or older. The average household size was 2.52 and the average family size was 3.00.

In the CDP the population was spread out, with 20.6% under the age of 18, 6.0% from 18 to 24, 28.8% from 25 to 44, 24.8% from 45 to 64, and 19.8% who were 65 years of age or older. The median age was 42 years. For every 100 females, there were 90.3 males. For every 100 females age 18 and over, there were 87.3 males.

The median income for a household in the CDP was $60,061, and the median income for a family was $67,050. Males had a median income of $47,176 versus $34,710 for females. The per capita income for the CDP was $25,480. About 1.6% of families and 3.9% of the population were below the poverty line, including 4.9% of those under age 18 and 7.8% of those age 65 or over.

White Horse Circle
White Horse Circle is a traffic circle locally known by name, in the southwest part of White Horse. 
Up until 2018 it was not a true traffic circle, because it was bisected by northbound U.S. Route 206, which made a left turn in the circle. This intersection connects South Broad Street (US 206 north and Route 524 east), White Horse-Mercerville Road (Route 533 north) and Bordentown Road (US 206 south). Only Route 533 had a stop sign at the circle, while Route 524 and the southern part of Route 206 have traffic signals some distance from the circle. To allow cars to move in a safe fashion, there were six yield-signed road segments allowing cars to get to Route 206 and from the highway to Route 533. Route 206, when the light allowed, had no yield sign restrictions. Since the completion of Interstate 195 and Interstate 295, which intersect southwest of the circle, much of the traffic that would have passed through the circle is able to use the wider, faster freeways, reducing the traffic load at the circle. Hamilton Township approved a construction project under which the modifications at the circle were completed by 2018, at a site that the township's engineer described as having an average of an accident a week. The new circle operates as a roundabout with two concentric lanes and many arrows to help drivers navigate the circle. The biggest change was the new requirement to yield to traffic in the circle, rather than yielding to traffic on the major roads.  Accidents have decreased since this new roundabout was finished.

In the 1927 New Jersey state highway renumbering, Route 37 was legislated to run from Route 27 and Route 30 (now U.S. Route 1 Business, U.S. Route 206, and Route 31) in Trenton continuing through the White Horse Circle and on to Seaside Heights. The western end of Route 37 was once planned to be at White Horse Circle, though that section of the planned route was eventually built as Interstate 195, with other portions returned to the counties as part of Route 524.

References

Census-designated places in Mercer County, New Jersey
Hamilton Township, Mercer County, New Jersey